Dinailurictis  is an extinct prehistoric carnivore nimravid belonging to the subfamily Nimravinae. It lived during late Oligocene in Europe.

It is believed that Dinailurictis is probably a synonym of Quercylurus major, and Quercylurus is a synonym of Nimravus intermedius major. So it means that Dinailurictis and Quercylurus may have looked like Nimravus, but all species of Nimravus were no larger than a large lynx and Quercylurus was about 1 m high and its weight was 300 kg, also Quercylurus major is older than Dinailurictis. This shows that Quercylurus might be ancestral to Dinailurictis.

If Dinailurictis was a synonym of Quercylurus, it might have a sleek body like caracal but its back was longer and feet of this nimravid probably were more dog-like than cat-like with partially retractable claws. Dinailurictis and Quercylurus probably hunted small mammals and birds. Its technique of hunting was ambushing them like modern cats rather than chasing them down. There is only one known species of this rare nimravid - Dinailurictis bonali. Bonis L. de, Gardin A. & Blondel C. 2019. — Carnivora from the early Oligocene of the ‘Phosphorites du Quercy’ in southwestern France, in Bonis L. de & Werdelin L. (eds), Memorial to Stéphane Peigné: Carnivores (Hyaenodonta and Carnivora) of the Cenozoic. Geodiversitas 41 (15): 601-621. https://doi.org/10.5252/geodiversitas2019v41a15.
http://geodiversitas.com/41/15.

References

Nimravidae
Oligocene feliforms
Oligocene mammals of Europe
Paleogene France
Fossils of France
Quercy Phosphorites Formation
Oligocene mammals of North America
Prehistoric carnivoran genera